The twenty-sixth series of the British reality television programme The Only Way Is Essex began airing on 13 September 2020. This series was due to air earlier in the year, but in March 2020 it was announced that filming had been postponed due to the COVID-19 pandemic in the United Kingdom. Whilst off air, it was announced that the series would return later in the year and would go back to airing two episodes per week, and that filming would take place with social distancing to protect cast and crew. Ahead of the series, it was announced that cast members Chloe Ross and Jayden Beales had been axed from the show. It was also confirmed that original cast member Amy Childs would be returning. Nicole Bass, Harry Derbidge and Fran Parman also returned.

During the series, the show celebrated its tenth anniversary, kicking off on 6 September 2020 with a special episode entitled "TOWIE Turns 10: All Back to Essex". The ninth episode, airing on 11 October 2020, was extended and featured a number of flashbacks as well as one-off appearances from former cast members including Danni Armstrong, Elliott Wright, Frankie Essex and Mario Falcone. As well as this, a spin-off series entitled The Towie Years aired for ten episodes across five weeks beginning on 10 October 2020. The series focused on the most memorable moments from each year. A festive special, "The Only Way Is Essexmas" aired on 16 December 2020, where cast members Georgia and Tommy announced they were expecting a baby.

Cast

Episodes

{| class="wikitable plainrowheaders" style="width:100%; background:#fff;"
! style="background:#58ACFA;"| Seriesno.
! style="background:#58ACFA;"| Episodeno.
! style="background:#58ACFA;"| Title
! style="background:#58ACFA;"| Original air date
! style="background:#58ACFA;"| Duration
! style="background:#58ACFA;"| UK viewers

|}

Ratings
Catch-up service totals were added to the official ratings.

References

The Only Way Is Essex
2020 British television seasons
Media depictions of the COVID-19 pandemic in the United Kingdom
Television shows about the COVID-19 pandemic